Stephanie McKenzie (born 15 February 1993) is a New Zealand professional racing cyclist. At age eight Stephanie was diagnosed with Type 1 Diabetes and due to it joined the Novo Nordisk team. Later on, she decided to attend Massey University where she plans on obtaining Bachelor of Sport and Exercise degree and join New Zealand Police. Before being introduced to cycling McKenzie did gymnastics, swimming and competed as a triathlete. She represented New Zealand at the 2010 and 2011 UCI Juniors World Championships as well as during the 2014 Commonwealth Games and the 2015 UCI Track Cycling World Championships.

Major results
2013
2nd Keirin, Invercargill
2014
BikeNZ Classic
1st Keirin
2nd Sprint
Oceania Track Championships
2nd Team Sprint (with Katie Schofield)
2nd 500m Time Trial
2nd Sprint, Festival of Speed
2nd Sprint, BikeNZ Cup
2015
2nd Keirin, Grand Prix of Colorado Springs

References

External links

1993 births
Living people
New Zealand female cyclists
Cyclists at the 2014 Commonwealth Games
Place of birth missing (living people)
Commonwealth Games competitors for New Zealand
21st-century New Zealand women